Marcel Dubé  (January 3, 1930 – April 7, 2016) was a Canadian playwright. He produced over 300 works for radio, television, and stage. During his career he promoted the preservation and sanctity of the French language in Quebec.


Early life and education
Dubé studied at Collège Sainte-Marie where he first became interested in theatre, frequenting the school's auditorium, the historic Salle du Gésu. He attended Westminster School during his high school years.

Career
Dubé began writing plays as a young man, including Le Barrage which was staged by Theatre-club in 1955. He was soon able to earn his living as a writer. He founded the group Jeune Scène, and at the Dominion Drama Festival in 1953 won several awards with his play, De l'autre côté du mur which later became Zone. The play is still being performed sixty years later. He was also considered a founder of contemporary Quebec dramaturgy.

Over the next five years Radio-Canada presented, on radio and television, over 30 of his works (many of which he later adapted to the stage). He has produced over 300 works for radio, television and the stage. He wrote mainly in French; some of his works have been translated or subtitled in English.

His concerns for the preservation and sanctity of the French language in Quebec and around the world led him to participate in several organizations: He was first secretary, then president, of the Conseil de la langue française, president of the Rencontres francophones du Québec and cofounder and director of the Sécretariat permanent des peuples francophones.

In February 2001, he was named an Officer of the Order of Canada. and in 1993 became an Officer of the Order of Quebec.

Works
    Zone, Montréal, Éditions de la cascade, Collège Sainte-Marie, (1956), (1968), (1971)
    Le temps des lilas, Québec, Institut littéraire, collection «Théâtre Canadien», (1958), (1969), (1973)
    Un simple soldat, Québec, Institut littéraire, collection «Théâtre Canadien», (1958), (1967), (1980)
    Florence, Québec, Institut littéraire du Québec ltée, (1960), (1970)
    Le Train du Nord, Montréal, Les Éditions du jour, (1961)
    Bilan, Montréal, Leméac, (1968)
    Textes et documents (partie 1), Montréal, Leméac, (1968)
    Les beaux dimanches, Montréal, Leméac, (1968)
    Hold-up, en collaboration avec Louis-Georges Carrier, Montréal, Leméac, (1969)
    Pauvre amour, Montréal, Leméac, (1969)
    Au retour des oies blanches, Montréal, Leméac, (1969)
    Le coup de l'étrier et Avant de t'en aller, Montréal, Leméac, (1970)
    Un matin comme les autres, Montréal, Leméac, (1971)
    Entre midi et soir, Montréal, Leméac, (1971), (1977)
    Le naufragé, Montréal, Leméac, (1971)
    The white geese, Toronto, new press, (1972)
    L'échéance du vendredi suivi de Paradis perdu, Montréal, Leméac, (1972)
    Textes et documents (partie 2), Montréal, Leméac, (1973)
    La cellule, Montréal, Leméac, (1973)
    Jérémie (argument de ballet), Montréal, Leméac, (1973)
    Médée, Montréal, Leméac, (1973)
    De l’autre côté du mur suivi de cinq pièces courtes, Montréal, Leméac, (1973)
    Manuel, Montréal, Leméac, (1974)
    Poèmes de sable, Montréal, Leméac, (1974)
    Virginie, Montréal, Leméac, (1974)
    L’impromptu de Québec ou le testament, Montréal, Leméac, (1974)
    L’été s’appelle Julie, Montréal, Leméac, (1975)
    Dites-le avec des fleurs, en collaboration avec Jean Barbeau, Montréal, Éditions Leméac, (1976)
    Octobre, Montréal, Éditions Leméac, (1977)
    Le réformiste ou l’honneur des hommes, Montréal, Éditions Leméac, (1977)
    Zone (Anglais), Toronto, Playwrights Canada, (1982)
    Le choix de Marcel Dubé dans l’œuvre de Marcel Dubé, Charlesbourg, Presses laurentiennes, (1986)
    L’Amérique à sec, Outremont, Leméac, (1986)
    Jean-Paul Lemieux et le livre, Montréal, Art global, (1988), (1993)
    Andrée Lachapelle : Entre ciel et terre, Montréal, Éditions Mnémosyne, coll. « Portraits d'artistes », (1995)
    Yoko ou le retour à Melbourne, Montréal, Leméac, (2000)
    Marie Labelle : Ottawa, Ontario

Awards and prizes
1953 – Bourse du ministère du Bien-Être et de la Jeunesse
1958 – Bourse Canada Foundation
1959 – Award from the Canada Council
1961 – Member of the Royal Society of Canada
1961 – Membre de l’Académie des lettres du Québec
1962 – Governor General's Award
1966 – Award from the Canada Council
1970 – Bourse du ministère des Affaires culturelles du Québec
1973 – Prix Athanase-David (the highest cultural award granted by the Quebec government at the time)
1984 – Molson Prize, Canada Council
1985 – Membre de l’Ordre des francophones d’Amérique
1985 – Honorary doctorate of letters, Université de Moncton
1986 – Médaille de l’Académie des lettres du Québec
1987 – Médaille de l’Académie canadienne-française
1991 – Chevalier de l’Ordre de Pléiade de l’Assemblée internationale des Parlementaires de la langue française
2001 – Prix Mérite du français dans la culture
2001 – Officer of the Order of Canada
2001 – Officer of the National Order of Quebec
2005 – Governor General's Performing Arts Award
2006 – Prix hommage Québécor

References

External links
 "Marcel Dube". The Canadian Encyclopedia
 Dubé, item at Athabasca University

1930 births
2016 deaths
20th-century Canadian dramatists and playwrights
21st-century Canadian dramatists and playwrights
Officers of the Order of Canada
Writers from Montreal
Prix Athanase-David winners
Canadian dramatists and playwrights in French
Governor General's Performing Arts Award winners
Canadian male dramatists and playwrights
Fellows of the Royal Society of Canada
Officers of the National Order of Quebec
20th-century Canadian male writers
21st-century Canadian male writers